Eglwys Fach, also known as Eglwys-fach or Eglwysfach, is a small village, roughly  outside of Aberystwyth, Ceredigion. It is known for being the home of Welsh poet R. S. Thomas from 1954, and he was vicar of St Michael's Church until 1967. The village hosts the R. S. Thomas Festival and Poetry Competition every year to celebrate the poet's works.

References

Villages in Ceredigion